Nadira (22 November 1968 – 6 August 1995) was a Pakistani film actress and dancer. She entered the film industry in 1986 and made her debut with the Punjabi film Akhri Jang. She was known as The White Rose for her portrayal of romantic roles in films. She mainly worked in Punjabi and Urdu films.

Early life
She was born as Malika Farah in Lahore in 1968.

Career
Nadira was introduced by director Yunus Malik to the Pakistani film industry by offering her a role in his film Akhri Jang in 1986. Nadira's first film was Akhri Jang (Last War), but director Altaf Hussain's Punjabi film Nishan (Mark) got released first, therefore, as per record, Nishan remains the first released film of Nadira.

Nadira was considered as talented actress, in film Nachay Nagin she played the best role of her life. In this film, she played the role of serpent for the first time and acclaimed a lot of fame along with the dancing hero Ismael Shah. Then she became famous for playing the role of serpent. She played role of serpent in Nachay Nagin, Nachay Jogi and Jadoo Garni.

Nadira starred in 52 films, out of which 25 enjoyed Silver jubilee, 4 enjoyed diamond jubilee and one film Akhri Jang enjoyed golden jubilee. She was known as " The White Rose" in industry. She was considered a good dancer. During her film career she starred in 2 Urdu, 35 Punjabi, 2 Pashto and 14 double version (Punjabi/Urdu) films.

Personal life
In 1993, she married a gold merchant Malik Ijaz Hussain with whom she had two children, elder daughter Rimsha Rubab & younger son Haider Ali. Nadira quit acting after marriage.

Death

Nadira was shot dead by unknown robbers on 6 August 1995 near Gulberg, Lahore. Nadira was on her way from a restaurant to her home. Robbers stopped her car; tried to snatch her car keys. Resistance from her husband led to firing from robbers. A bullet hit the neck of Nadira, who was on front seat and she was killed. Accusations of murder were made on Nadira's husband, but investigations could not prove Nadira's husband Malik Ijaz Hussain as her murderer.

Filmography

Film

Awards and recognition

Notes

References

External links
 

1968 births
Actresses from Lahore
Actresses in Punjabi cinema
Actresses in Urdu cinema
Actresses from Punjab, Pakistan
1995 deaths
Pakistani film actresses
Punjabi people
20th-century Pakistani actresses
Nigar Award winners
Unsolved murders in Pakistan